The Journal of Developmental Origins of Health and Disease is a bimonthly peer-reviewed medical journal covering the field of Developmental Origins of Health and Disease. It was established in 2010 and is published by Cambridge University Press on behalf of the International Society for Developmental Origins of Health and Disease. The editor-in-chief is Michael G. Ross (Harbor-UCLA Medical Center). According to the Journal Citation Reports, the journal has a 2018 impact factor of 2.34, ranking it 71st out of 185 journals in the category "Public, Environmental & Occupational Health".

References

External links

General medical journals
Public health journals
Publications established in 2010
Cambridge University Press academic journals
English-language journals
Bimonthly journals